Narasingha Mishra (Odia: ନରସିଂହ ମିଶ୍ର ; born 23 December 1940) is a politician from Odisha, India. He was the Leader of Opposition in the 15th Odisha Legislative Assembly. 

He was the Deputy Leader of the Congress Legislature Party from 2004-2009. He was first elected to the assembly in 1990 and served as the Law Minister. He represents  Balangir constituency from the Indian National Congress party. He has got 71598 votes while his main opposition candidate Arkesh Narayan Singh Deo from Biju Janata Dal got 66257 number of votes.

Background
Narasingha Mishra (Narsing Mishra/Narasingh Mishra) comes from the small village of Chhatamakhna near Balangir in Odisha.
His father, Yudhisthir Mishra, was a lawyer and a member of the Constituent assembly of India. 
Born into a family where politics was a part and parcel of the daily life, he joined politics at the age of 18 and was enrolled as a member of the Communist Party of India and continued as such until 1993. During that period, he held many party positions and successfully led several agitations.

He has had a very successful practice as a lawyer. Except for the period when he was a minister he has remained in active practice.
Notable amongst his achievements for public cause as a lawyer was, the Orissa High Court directive to state government for direct procurement of paddy from farmers.

Political career 
Although he joined the state legislature only in 1990, he was considered to be a power center in Balangir for a long time. He is said to be the mentor of many presents and former public representatives from the region and this probably makes him a potent force irrespective of the party he represents.

He was first elected to the Odisha Assembly from Loisingha under the Bolangir (Lok Sabha constituency) and joined the cabinet as the Minister of Law. One of his major contributions as a minister was the Special Courts Bill, with which Odisha aimed to fight corruption in high places.

After losing the 2000 elections he fought back from Luisinga in 2004 and is the Deputy Leader of Congress Legislature Party in Odisha assembly.
He lost the Parliamentary elections from the Balangir Parliamentary Constituency in 2009. He is currently a part-time member of the Law Commission of India. He won the Bolangir Constituency with 61730 votes in Assembly Election 2014 from Balangir District of Odisha, by a margin of 12254 compared to his/her immediate rival Ananga Udaya Singhdeo of BJD.

Professional 
Member Odisha state bar council from 1985 to 1990.
Member 19th law commission, Govt. of India.
Vice President of State unit of Indo-Soviet-Cultural Society.
Vice President of State unit of International Peace Council.
Chairman, Special Committee constituted by Odisha Legislative Assembly.
Chairman, Special Committee to examine and suggest necessary amendment to the existing Rules of Procedure and Conduct of Business in the Odisha Legislative Assembly.
Member of Public Accounts Committee

References

External links

Former Law Minister of Orissa Narasingha Mishra nominated as member of Law Commission of India
candidate profile

See also
Law Commission of India

1940 births
Living people
Odisha politicians
Members of the Odisha Legislative Assembly
Indian National Congress politicians
State cabinet ministers of Odisha
Leaders of the Opposition in Odisha
Janata Dal politicians
Communist Party of India politicians from Odisha
Janata Dal (United) politicians
Odisha MLAs 2019–2024